Black Friday is a comedy-horror musical with music and lyrics by Jeff Blim and a book by Matt and Nick Lang. It is the twelfth staged show produced by StarKid Productions and takes place in the same setting as their previous musical The Guy Who Didn't Like Musicals, though in an alternate universe where the events of the previous musical never happened. The show ran from October 31, 2019 to December 8, 2019 at the Hudson Mainstage Theatre in Los Angeles, California, directed by Nick Lang. A live recording of the musical was uploaded on YouTube on February 29, 2020 and sold on DVD. A cast recording was released on February 29, 2020 on Apple Music and their website.

Funding for the show was done through Kickstarter, similarly to StarKid's most recent shows. The project raised US$547,439 through 11,704 backers out of its $155,000 goal.

Black Friday was intended to feature the entire cast of The Guy Who Didn't Like Musicals in new roles alongside new cast members. However, soon after she was announced as Lex, Mariah Rose Faith was cast in the national tour of Mean Girls, making her the only cast member of the prior musical not to appear in Black Friday. Angela Giarratana was then cast as Faith's replacement. Black Friday is also notable for the return of Dylan Saunders, a founding member of StarKid, who had not appeared since Twisted in 2013. Kendall Nicole Yakshe, who plays Hannah/Tim, is the first minor to be featured in one of Starkid's productions.

A third musical in the Hatchetfield series entitled Nerdy Prudes Must Die was created and performed in 2023 with several Black Friday cast and crew members returning. It is not a direct sequel.

Synopsis

Act 1 
Uncle Wiley and the Sniggles advertise a new doll called a Tickle-Me-Wiggly by Uncle Wiley Toys ("Tickle-Me Wiggly Jingle").

On the day after Thanksgiving, Paul Matthews and Emma Perkins arrive at the house of Emma's brother-in-law Tom Houston, a cranky veteran with PTSD. Jane, Emma's sister and Tom's wife, died in a car accident recently. Paul and Emma discover that Tom has to leave and only invited them to babysit his son Tim. After Tim leaves the room, Tom tells them that he's actually going to get Tim a Tickle-Me-Wiggly as a surprise for Christmas. After learning that they are running out fast, he leaves right away and vows to get the doll any way he can to make up for Tim losing his mother the year before ("What Tim Wants").

Once he arrives, he runs into Lex Foster, a snarky and cynical employee at ToyZone who used to be a student in a high school class he taught. Resentful, she explains that Tom's shop class was the only thing keeping up her GPA, and when he quit, she failed high school. As Lex is an employee of ToyZone (the only store selling Wiggly dolls in town) he asks her to set aside a doll for him, though she refuses.

As Tom goes inside, ToyZone's greedy manager, Frank Pricely, arrives and reprimands Lex for slacking off. The shipment of Wiggly dolls arrives at the hands of a mysterious delivery man. Pricely tells Lex to unpack a box of the Wiggly dolls. After he leaves, she sneaks one into her backpack. Lex's greaser boyfriend Ethan Green surprises her with her troubled and possibly psychic sister Hannah who they take care of together. Hannah ominously announces the day will have "bad blood." This is dismissed, however, when Ethan tells Lex what a hot ticket item the doll is and how their plans to sell Lex's stolen doll have changed; while the doll normally sells for $49.95, Ethan has found a buyer willing to pay $7,000. They celebrate and reiterate their plan to move to California. Lex writes a letter to her alcoholic mother telling her that they are leaving and taking Hannah ("Califor.M.I.A."). Lex gives her backpack containing the stolen doll to Hannah and gets ready for her shift.

Outside the store, Linda Monroe, town socialite, bribes her way to the front of the line. She's reprimanded by Becky Barnes, a pediatric nurse buying a doll for one of her patients. Linda shames her for her abusive marriage and calls her weak. As Tom attempts to cut in line, he reunites with Becky, and the other shoppers gossip about their past as high school sweethearts ("What Do You Say"). Becky admits that she misses Tom, but before they can continue, Pricely opens the store and exalts the beauties of capitalism ("Our Doors Are Open"). When middle-aged toy collector and presumed sexual deviant Sherman Young tries to buy all the dolls for himself, a fight breaks out amongst the shoppers. Frank, drawn by his greed, allows a bidding war, resulting in chaos and mayhem that spread to the rest of the mall as the desire for the doll becomes greater ("Feast or Famine").

Oblivious to the fighting, Ethan and Hannah try to buy tickets to see a Christmas movie at the mall's Cineplex. Two shoppers arrive and attack Ethan under the impression he is hiding a doll. Hannah escapes and Ethan is rescued by Tom and Becky, who has acquired a doll herself. Delirious, Ethan promises to get Lex to California before he dies. A man in a hurry sees Becky with the doll and stabs Tom before escaping with the doll. Elsewhere in the mall, a bedraggled Linda runs into the mysterious delivery man. He knows her name and claims she is meant for greater things. Allured by the promise of power and adoration, Linda accepts his offer.
 
Meanwhile, in the Oval Office, President Howard Goodman and his Cabinet are debating what to do regarding the Wiggly crisis, which has spread across the country. Once the Vice President reveals he has a doll, the Cabinet begins to attack one another to obtain it. They are interrupted by General John McNamara of PEIP (/pēp/), a secret agency that handles paranormal, extraterrestrial, and inter-dimensional threats. PEIP has discovered that Wiggly dolls are more sinister than they appear, and McNamara informs the Cabinet that they have to make a quick decision about what to do ("Monsters and Men").

Act 2 
As the movie Santa Claus is Going to High School plays ("Deck the Halls (of Northville High)"), Tom wakes up in the movie theater. As Becky nurses his stab wound, they realize that they're sitting in their old seats from when they dated and begin to reminisce over their younger days. Tom admits that he feels responsible for Jane's death because he was driving when the car crashed. Becky confesses to stabbing her abusive husband Stanley and leaving him for dead. As they watch the movie and reminisce, they both admit they still have feelings for each other and try to console each other ("Take Me Back").

At PEIP headquarters, McNamara introduces President Goodman to his second-in-command Xander Lee and reveals to the President the existence of "the Black and White," a place between dimensions and the origin of the entity known as Wiggly. PEIP believes that Wiggly is attempting to push its way into our dimension where it will remake existence according to its own will. ("In essence, we're trying to stop the birth of a god." says McNamara.) To do so, they will send Goodman through a portal into the Black and White, where the President will attempt to work out a peace treaty with Wiggly. If that fails, PEIP will deploy a nuclear bomb inside the Black and White, hopefully destroying Wiggly.

Back at the mall, Sherman Young leads a sermon celebrating Wiggly's supposed prophet Linda. The shoppers have also captured Pricely and Lex. When Pricely tells Linda there are no dolls left, she kills him. She tries to get information out of Lex, who remains defiant. A security guard tells Linda that he saw Hannah running through the mall with the doll. Linda orders her followers to find Hannah and the doll ("Adore Me").

Hiding in the mall, Hannah sees a vision of Ethan, who tells her to give the doll to Linda. She realizes, however, that something is wrong. Ethan is really a manifestation of Wiggly from the Black and White. Hannah takes out the doll from her backpack and hears Wiggly's voice threatening to kill her. She is snapped back into reality when Tom and Becky find her. When Tom threatens her for the doll, she runs away, but the adults continue to search for her, intending to anesthetize her and steal the doll ("Do You Want To Play"). They eventually find her, but Becky accidentally injects herself with the anesthesia. Tom finally gets the Tickle-Me-Wiggly and abandons Becky. Two members of the Wiggly cult find Becky and Hannah and take them to Linda, believing them to still be in possession of the doll.

As Goodman enters the portal, he encounters the same mysterious delivery man who ran into Linda: Uncle Wiley. More terrifyingly, Goodman also encounters an enormous, monstrous abomination that can only be Wiggly itself. Wiley and the Sniggles taunt Goodman for the capitalist, consumerist culture that allowed their plan to unfold ("Made in America"). All of a sudden, McNamara appears unprotected, saving Goodman and allowing himself to be lost to the Black and White. Goodman returns to PEIP headquarters and tells Agent Lee to release the bomb even though McNamara is still inside. The bomb, however, does not explode in the Black and White. Goodman and Lee receive news that a bomb has exploded in Moscow. Wiggly tells them that he has pushed the bomb through another portal that the Russians had created on their own. The President is taken to safety and Lee acknowledges that World War III has begun.

Back in the mall, Sherman holds Lex hostage, but lets her go when offered all the ponies left in the storeroom. Once free, Lex tells him that she lied and in anger, Sherman strangles Lex. In her dying moments, she laments over the failure of her life ("Black Friday"). At the last moment, McNamara appears to her, reminding her that she isn't dead yet and that she, like her sister, has powers. He offers her his gun, but because he is still in the Black and White, she has to reach through dimensions to get to it ("Monsters and Men (Reprise)"). She successfully manifests the gun, shoots Sherman, and follows McNamara's instructions to save the world from Wiggly. Finding Tom in possession of the last doll, she tells him that Tim doesn't actually want the doll and that it's all part of Wiggly's plan to make people think that a doll can fill a hole in their lives. Tom realizes that he just wanted to make up for Jane's passing and that all Tim wants is his father ("If I Fail You"). He agrees to help Lex and they go to find Linda.

In the mall's food court, the followers bring Becky and Hannah to Linda. Believing that Becky is dead, they focus on Hannah, ripping away her backpack in an attempt to find the doll. When Linda realizes that Hannah doesn't have the doll, she goes to stab the girl but is stopped when Lex rushes in holding the last remaining doll in the mall. Tom sneaks up on Linda and holds a gun to her head, shocking the followers. Linda, however, is able to distract Lex and disarm Tom. She finally gets her hands on a Tickle-Me-Wiggly. The followers praise their god ("Wiggle"), too distracted to remember Becky. She gets ahold of the gun and kills Linda. Lex sets fire to the doll and in the ensuing chaos, the mall burns down with the cultists inside. Hannah, Lex, Tom, and Becky reunite with Paul and Emma. Hannah recounts an odd, ambiguous vision of an uncertain future ("What If Tomorrow Comes?"). In the last seconds of the blackest of Black Fridays, the surviving shoppers gather together as a mysterious "whooshing" noise is heard.

Musical numbers 

Act 1
 "Tickle-Me Wiggly Jingle" – Uncle Wiley, Ensemble
 "What Tim Wants" – Tom
 "Califor.M.I.A." – Lex, Ethan, Hannah
 "What Do You Say?" – Company
 "Our Doors Are Open" – Frank, Lex, Company
 "Feast Or Famine" – Company
 "Monsters and Men" – General McNamara, President Howard Goodman, Company
Act 2
 "Deck The Halls" – Chris Kringle, Jingle, Jangle, Noel, Ensemble
 "Take Me Back" – Tom, Becky, and Company
 "Adore Me" – Linda, Ensemble
 "Do You Want To Play?" – Becky, Tom
 "Made In America" – Uncle Wiley, Ensemble
 "Black Friday" – Lex
 "Monsters and Men (Reprise)" – General McNamara
 "If I Fail You" – Tom
 "Wiggle" – Linda, Ensemble
 "What If Tomorrow Comes?" – Hannah, Company

Roles

Main characters 

 Tom Houston, a war veteran. He lost his wife Jane the year prior and has a son named Tim. He used to date Becky in high school.
 Alexandra "Lex" Foster, a teenager who works at ToyZone. She dates Ethan and takes care of her younger sister Hannah.
 Becky Barnes, a nurse. She used to date Tom in high school.
 Linda Monroe, a spoiled trophy wife to Gerald and mother of four boys. She later becomes Wiggly's prophet.
 Hannah Foster, a troubled young girl with possible psychic powers. She lives with Lex and Ethan.

Supporting characters 
 Ethan Green, Lex's boyfriend. He is shown to care deeply about her and Hannah.
General John MacNamara, a general for a secret agency called PEIP.
President Howard Goodman, the President of the United States.
Frank Pricely, the greedy manager of ToyZone.
 Sherman Young, a middle-aged toy collector who wants to buy all the Wiggly dolls for himself.
 Gary Goldstein, an attorney at law, who appears to be the only one in town as he represents multiple characters throughout the show, most notably Linda Monroe.
 Wiggly, a malevolent extra-dimensional entity that wants to rule the world. It takes the form of a doll.

Featured characters 
 Uncle Wiley, a mysterious man who works for Wiggly.
Xander Lee, a physicist and field agent with PEIP.
Man in a Hurry, a man in a hurry.
 Tim Houston, Tom's son who lost his mother the year prior.
 Christopher Kringle, a character in Santa Claus is Goin' to High School, a movie-within-the-play. He is Santa having taken the form of a high school student.
 Noelle, a character in Santa Claus is Goin' to High School and Chris Kringle's love interest.
 Paul Matthews, a guy who doesn't like musicals. He's dating Emma.
 Emma Perkins, a barista at Beanie's. She's dating Paul and is the sister-in-law of Tom.

Crew

Sequels 

Black Friday served as the second instalment in the Hatchetfield Series, following The Guy Who Didn't Like Musicals.

As a result of plans being postponed due to the COVID-19 pandemic, StarKid Productions premiered a series of live-readings as a new instalment in the Hatchetfield series. The first season of was announced on October 1, 2020 with the entire casts of both The Guy Who Didn't Like Musicals and Black Friday returning. The series featured several returning characters from both series. The first episode of the series was streamed live to YouTube on October 10, 2020 featuring two stories: "The Hatchetfield Ape-Man" and "Watcher World." The final two episodes were performed live on October 17 and October 24, 2020 featuring the stories "Forever & Always, "Time Bastard," "Jane's A Car" and "The Witch in the Web." These episodes were then released on YouTube on February 14, 2021. A second season was announced on October 8, 2021. The series featured 4 episodes with six stories: "Honey Queen," "Perky's Buds," "Abstinence Camp," "Daddy," "Killer Track" and "Yellow Jacket." The entire cast of the original series returned apart from Kendall Nicole and Robert Manion and they were joined by Jae Hughes and Bryce Charles. The episodes were announced to be released weekly on YouTube from May 20, 2022 to June 10, 2022.

A short film titled “Workin’ Boys” was announced in 2019 as a reward for Black Friday’s Kickstarter campaign. Production of the film was delayed due to the COVID-19 pandemic.

A third musical entitled Nerdy Prudes Must Die was created by the same writing team and performed from February 16-25, 2023.

References

2019 musicals
2020 YouTube videos
Criticism of capitalism
Original musicals
Plays set in Michigan
Plays set in the 21st century
Science fiction musicals
Sequel plays
StarKid Productions musicals
Horror plays